Idonije is a Nigerian surname. Notable people with the surname include:

Benson Idonije (born 1936), Nigerian broadcaster and music critic 
Israel Idonije (born 1980), Nigerian-Canadian NFL player and actor

Surnames of Nigerian origin